The Cambodia Daily is an English and Khmer language news site that writes and aggregates news about Cambodia.  It was originally an English-language daily newspaper based in Cambodia from 1993 to 2017, and was considered a newspaper of record for Cambodia.

The 2017 closure was the result of a dispute with the Cambodian government over an arbitrary US$6.3 million tax bill, which was seen by many as politically motivated. The newspaper ceased its daily print newspaper, but still maintains an online presence, and is no longer located in Cambodia.

In 2017, the Cambodian government ordered ISP's to block The Cambodia Daily's website from within Cambodia.

History
The Cambodia Daily was started in 1993 by Bernard Krisher, an American journalist and philanthropist.  Krisher's aim for the paper, as outlined in an article in its first issue, was twofold: to create an independent newspaper of record and to train Cambodian journalists. The newspaper's motto was "All the news without fear or favor".

Krisher hired two young and relatively inexperienced journalists, Barton Biggs and Robin McDowell, as the paper's first editors. The first issue was published on August 20, 1993, and the last print issue was published on September 4, 2017. It relaunched as an online-only news site in October 2017. At the time it started publication, The Daily was Cambodia's only English-language daily newspaper. The Phnom Penh Post, which had been in print since 1992, was only printed fortnightly until it began daily publication in early 2008.
James Kanter served as editor in chief of The Cambodia Daily from 1995 to 1997.

Content 
The Daily was printed in Phnom Penh in an A4-size format and was delivered six days a week, Monday to Saturday, until 2017, when it reduced its print run to five days per week. The paper featured four to ten pages of local news daily written by its Cambodian and foreign reporters. Its regional and international news sections consisted of copy donated and purchased from major news outlets and wire services (e.g. Reuters, The Washington Post, New York Times, Asahi, Kyodo News). The weekend edition of the paper was accompanied by a full-color Weekend magazine insert that included local and international feature pieces. A daily section in Khmer language carried articles translated from the main English-language section, and the Monday issue of the paper included "English Weekly", a special insert with news quizzes for English learners.

Notable stories 
The Daily was known for its coverage of local news and particularly for its investigative reporting on illegal logging and its coverage of corruption and human rights abuses, including land grabs and forced evictions.

Award-winning reporting 
The Daily has won a number of awards for its investigative reporting and feature stories. In 2017, Daily journalists Aun Pheap and Zsombor Peter won an Excellence in Investigative Reporting from the Society of Publishers in Asia (SOPA) for their article "Still Taking a Cut," which exposed the involvement of the Cambodian military in the country's illegal logging trade. In 2016, Daily journalists won a SOPA Excellence in Feature Writing award for their article, "Moving Dirt: A lucrative dirt trade is leaving holes in communities".

Somaly Mam investigation 
Cambodia Daily led a years-long investigation into famed anti-trafficking activist Somaly Mam, former president of the Somaly Mam Foundation, over discrepancies in her autobiography, The Road of Lost Innocence, which detailed her backstory as a sex slave in Cambodia, becoming an international bestseller. The Daily first began reporting on inconsistencies in her public comments and claims made in her book in early-2012, and in October 2013 published results of its investigation into claims of trafficking made in Mam's book that reporters found to have been fabricated. A Newsweek exposé by former Cambodia Daily editor Simon Marks in May 2014 focused international attention on the alleged falsifications, and Mam stepped down from her foundation just days after the article's publication.

The New York Times credited The Cambodia Daily with first pointing out that Somaly Mam's stories of her childhood were false in 2012 and 2013.

Print closure 

The Cambodia Daily published its final issue on September 4, 2017, announcing its immediate closure. According to the owners, the closure was the result of a dispute with the Cambodian government over an arbitrary US$6.3 million tax bill, which was disputed by the newspaper as politically motivated.  The Cambodian Department of Taxation disputed the accusation of political motivation, and commented that the tax bill was aimed at supporting the national budget. The Cambodian government had started a tax reform initiative in 2013 to increase the government’s tax revenue collection capabilities and better regulate Cambodia’s significant informal economy.

The paper's final front page featured the headline "Descent into Outright Dictatorship" above its top article on the arrest of Cambodian National Rescue Party President Kem Sokha, and was published amid a "deteriorating" political climate in Cambodia, according to the UN Human Rights Office.

The paper's closure followed the ban of popular independent radio news programs Voice of America, Radio Free Asia and Voice of Democracy as part of a country-wide media crackdown. The journalist community and Cambodian civil society showed their support for the paper with the social media movement #SaveTheDaily, and its closure received international coverage, including in The New York Times, The Guardian, The Washington Post and Al Jazeera.

Within six weeks of the paper's closure, a news digest appeared on its website signaling an attempt to relaunch the shuttered paper as an online-only news service from outside Cambodia. On February 4, 2018, the Phnom Penh Post reported that the Cambodian Telecoms Ministry Secretary of State Khay Khunheng had ordered all Cambodian ISPs "to block the [Cambodia Daily's] webpage . . . and guarantee that this webpage and IP address will no longer be operating in the Kingdom of the Cambodia”. The letter also requested to block access to the Daily’s Facebook and Twitter accounts.

Relaunch 
Despite the government-ordered blocking of The Cambodia Daily's online presence, the numbers of its readership and social media followers have increased since September 2017. While the print publication was an English-language newspaper with Khmer translations, the online service strengthened its Khmer language news service presenting its content in not only text but also in audio and video format. The Cambodia Daily Youtube channel in Khmer was launched in February 2018 and gained about 2,000 subscribers within its first two months; as of March 2019, it had around 28,000 subscribers. It caters to the growing number of smartphone owners across the nation and to an audience of varying levels of literacy. The content is either written and edited or aggregated offshore and available through The Cambodia Daily website, Facebook, and YouTube.

Notable staff
 Molly Ball
 Thomas Beller
 Robert Bingham
 Bernard Krisher
 Kelly McEvers
 Graeme Wood

See also
Media of Cambodia

References

External links

Khmer News Aggregator - including other popular Khmer news sites.

Newspapers published in Cambodia
English-language newspapers published in Asia
Mass media in Phnom Penh
Defunct daily newspapers
2017 disestablishments in Cambodia